Xicotencatl or Xicohtencatl may refer to:
Xicotencatl I, or Xicotencatl the Elder
Xicotencatl II, or Xicotencatl the Younger
Xicoténcatl, Tabasco
Xicoténcatl Municipality, Tamaulipas
Xicoténcatl National Park in Tlaxcala